In 1947, the American Friends Service Committee (AFSC) and the Quaker Peace and Social Witness (QPSW) (previously known as the Friends Service Council) jointly received the Nobel Peace Prize on behalf of all Quakers around the world "for their pioneering work in the international peace movement and compassionate effort to relieve human suffering, thereby promoting the fraternity between nations." The award was established in accordance to Alfred Nobel's will, specifically to individuals or groups "who shall have done the most or the best work for fraternity between nations, for the abolition or reduction of standing armies and for the holding and promotion of peace congresses."

As previous Nobel laureates are qualified to nominate annually according to the Nobel Foundation's statutes, AFSC and QPSW formed a Nobel Peace Prize Nominating Task Group which selects and recommends future Nobel laureates – individuals or organizations – who they believe best manifests "the divine spark in action in the human family." Five of the ASFC Nobel nominees were eventually awarded namely to John Boyd-Orr (1949), Dag Hammarskjöld (1961; posthumously), Martin Luther King Jr. (1964), Desmond Tutu (1984) and Jimmy Carter (2002).

ASFC Nobel nominees

Criteria for Nobel nomination
Before a final nominee is unanimously agreed by the AFSC Board and recommended to the Norwegian Nobel Committee, 
the Nominating Task Group spends ten months annually discerning, through heavy research, prayerful consideration and careful discussion.  Aside from Alfred Nobel's criteria based on his 1895 will, the AFSC Nobel Peace Prize Nominating Task Group primarily observes the following criteria:

List of ASFC nominees for Nobel Peace Prize

References

External links
 American Friends Service Committee
 Quakers and the Nobel Prize

Lists of Nobel laureates by religion
Nobel Peace Prize